Thomas Frei (born 19 January 1985) is a Swiss road bicycle racer. Frei was Swiss Junior champion in road cycling in 2002. Between 2004 and 2006 he cycled for the Bürgis Cycling Team and won the Mountain Championship for U23 cyclists. There he was roommate and domestique for future Tour de France champion Cadel Evans.

In his second season with BMC, Frei tested positive for EPO. He was withdrawn from competition by his team in April 2010 during the Giro del Trentino when the doping violation was revealed, before the team released him altogether.

As of August 2011, Frei was training full-time with the intention of returning to professional cycling upon the completion of his two-year suspension from competition.

Major results 

2002 
National Junior Road Championships
1st  Road race
3rd Time trial
 1st Mountainrun Bowil-Chuderhüsi
 2nd Mountainrun Silenen-Amsteg-Bristen
 2nd Habsburgrundfahrt
 3rd Gerzenseerundfahrt
 3rd Rund um die Rigi
 3rd Varese
2003
 2nd Mountain zeitfahren Niederbipp
3rd Overall Grand Prix Rüebliland
1st Stage 3
2006
 1st Swiss Cycling Championship Team Time Trial
 1st Swiss Cycling Championship Mountain u23
 1st La Brevine Team Time Trial
 2nd Swiss Cycling Championship Mountain Elite/Profi
 2nd Swiss Cycling Championship Individual Time Trial u23
 3rd Wileroltigen
 3rd Gansingen
4th Overall GP Tell
1st Mountains classification
8th Overall Mainfranken-Tour
1st Mountains classification
2009
 1st Stage 5 GP Tell
2012
1st Stage 1 Tour of China I (TTT)
2nd Time trial, National Road Championships

References

External links 
 Official Site
 

Swiss male cyclists
1985 births
Living people
Place of birth missing (living people)
Swiss sportspeople in doping cases
Doping cases in cycling
Sportspeople from Lausanne